The Arctic Ice Project is a Silicon Valley non-profit research organization that aims to slow climate change by restoring ice in the Arctic. Their  scientific research in ice preservation technologies represents an opportunity to buy up to 15 more years for the world's economies to decarbonize. The organization has built an innovation network of prestigious external scientific partnerships that include the top specialists and organizations in the climate field in order to coordinate a moonshot effort to stop Arctic ice melt in key portions of the Arctic, our planet's heat-shield.

Solution 
The Arctic Ice Project's approach is to spread hollow silica microspheres (reflective sand) on top of ice in the Arctic. The microspheres raise the reflecting power of polar ice. This reduces the amount of sunlight absorbed, and slows the melting of the ice.

The microspheres are bright white, and each one is 35 microns in diameter (less than the diameter of a human hair). The microspheres are filled with air and they float. The vision is to cover a strategic area of the Arctic about the size of Belgium with microspheres. Target locations will be near communities that depend on the ice, and routes through which melting ice reaches the wider ocean.

The Arctic Ice Project aims to rebuild a natural system with the least possible intervention. The Arctic Ice Project's silica microspheres will dissolve over time.  This is a form of “soft geoengineering”. It is claimed to be less damaging and more reversible than other techniques.

Some scientists are concerned about the risks of restoring Arctic ice, as this approach could have unintended consequences. The Arctic Ice Project maintains that its approach will not drastically alter the ecosystem or pollute the environment.

].

References

External links 
 
 

Climate engineering